The Bayer designation Kappa Apodis (Kappa Aps / κ Apodis / κ Aps) is shared by two star systems in the constellation Apus:
 Kappa¹ Apodis (HR 5730)
 Kappa² Apodis (HR 5782)
They are separated by 0.63° on the sky.

Apus (constellation)
Apodis, Kappa